NSoft d.o.o. Mostar is a business-to-business software development company based in Mostar, Bosnia and Herzegovina with clients from over 35 countries. NSoft is also a member of Bit Alliance, a non-government organization that gathers IT companies from Bosnia and Herzegovina. The company employs over 300 people.
The main activity is software development and custom software for bookmakers and gaming industry, including inhouse development of virtual games and draw-based games. The company is also engaged in the development of software for video management system. Their AI-based software for surveillance is called Vision.

Business results
NSoft has grown at high pace and thus has been listed in Deloitte Fast 50 CE and Deloitte Fast 500 EMEA Awards based on the revenue growth over five years.

Net profit of the company in 2017 was 5.99 million BAM (3.06 million EUR) with revenue of 21.55 million BAM (11.02 million EUR).
In 2018 NSoft recorded revenue in the amount of 22.11 million BAM (11.3 million EUR), and the net profit of 3.69 million BAM (1.89 mullion EUR). In the analysis of business results of IT companies in Bosnia and Herzegovina, NSoft was positioned sixth by net income and third by net profit.
Revenue in 2019 amounted to 24.95 million BAM (12.76 million EUR) with the recorded net profit of 2.51 million BAM (1.28 million EUR). The profit declined in 2019 compared to the previous four years.

In 2018 The Foreign Investment Promotion Agency of BiH (FIPA) (State Agency from Bosnia and Herzegovina) has put NSoft on its “The Most Significant Investor in BiH”  list together with 11 more companies from different industries.

References

Software companies established in 2008
Companies of Bosnia and Herzegovina